Aaages is a genus of beetle in the family Coccinellidae (ladybird beetles, or ladybugs). The original spelling used for the type species, Aaages prior (Barovskij, 1926), has frequently been misspelled in the subsequent literature.

References

Coccinellidae genera